Aaram Haram Aahe is a Marathi movie released on 26 October 1976. The movie was produced by Prem Chitra and directed by Kamlakar Torne.

Cast 
The cast includes Ravindra Mahajani, Ruhi, Sharad Talwalkar, Ganesh Solanki & Others

Soundtrack
The music has been directed by Sudhir Phadke.

Track listing

References

External links 
 IMDB - imdb.com
 Movie Release Date - imdb.com

1976 films
1970s Marathi-language films